Golla may refer to:
Golla (caste), a caste from Andhra Pradesh, India
Golla (company), a Finnish design company making cases and bags for portable electronics

People with the surname
George Golla, Australian jazz guitarist
Victor Golla, American linguist
Wojciech Golla, Polish footballer
Frank Golla, Filipino basketball player

See also
Gola (disambiguation)